The Ratcliff or Baker Hill site is a 16th-century Huron-Wendat ancestral village located on one of the headwater tributaries of the Rouge River on the south side of the Oak Ridges Moraine in present-day Whitchurch–Stouffville, approximately 25 kilometers north of Toronto. The Ratcliff/Baker Hill site is located on the east side of Highway 48, south of Bloomington Road in Whitchurch–Stouffville. 
The ravine on the village site was infilled during the early 1950s to allow for the expansion of a neighboring quarry.

The village occupied approximately 2.8 hectares on the brow of a hill overlooking a steep ravine on the west side. 

The artifacts found on the site in the mid-19th century included stone-axes, flint arrows and spear heads, broken crockery, many earthen and stone pipes, bears' teeth with holes bored through them, polished teeth of beaver, deer and moose for decorative use; bone needles, and fish-spears made of deer shoulder-blades, as well as millstones used by the women for crushing corn. A human skull was found "perforated with seven holes, and had evidently been held as a trophy, the holes being the score of enemies slaughtered in battle by the wearer." 

The ceramics found on the site indicate that the local community must have had some contact with other Iroquoian groups living in present-day upstate New York and in the St. Lawrence Valley.  The large quantity of both ground and chipped stone indicates that the Wendat Village was involved with the production and distribution of stone artifacts. The presence of some contact-period (European) artifacts, such as black glass and copper beads, suggest that the site was inhabited between the late 16th and early 17th centuries. 

About 400 meters north of the Ratcliff site on lot 10 in concession 8, a mass grave with "many hundreds" of Huron skeletons was discovered and removed in the late 1840s. In ancient Huron tradition, the dead would be initially buried in a temporary grave.  Every ten years the accumulated bones would be moved to a mass grave in an elaborate ceremony.

The inhabitants likely came here from the so-called Mantle Site, located five kilometers to the south-east in Stouffville, when the latter was abandoned in the early 17th century. The Ratcliff site was occupied at the same time as the so-called Aurora or Old Fort site, four kilometres north-west of Ratcliff, also within the boundaries of what is today Whitchurch–Stouffville.

Today the site is still occupied by a quarry. Farms surround the site itself.

References

Further reading 

 Barkey, Jean, et al. "Whitchurch Township". Erin, ON: Boston Mills, 1992. Pp. 122f.
 Birch, Jennifer. Coalescent Communities Iroquoian Ontario. PhD Dissertation, Dept. of Anthropology, McMaster University, 2010.
 Birch, Jennifer. "Coalescence and Conflict in Iroquoian Ontario," Archeological Review from Cambridge 25, no. 1 (2010), 29–48.
 Emerson, J.Norman. The Archaeology of the Ontario Iroquois. Ph.D. dissertation, Department of Anthropology, University of Chicago, 1954.
 Emerson, J. Norman. "The Old Indian Fort Site." Ontario History 50, 1 (1958). pp. 55–6.
 Dibb, G. "An Archaeological Survey of the East Holland River and Its Environs." Ms. on file, Archaeology Unit, Ministry of Culture and Communications, Toronto, 1979.
 Mulvany, C.P., et al. "The Township of Whitchurch". History of Toronto and County of York, Ontario. Toronto: C.B. Robinson, 1885. Pp. 149f.
 Sioui, Georges E. "Wendat: The Heritage of the Circle". Trans. J. Brierley. Vancouver, BC: UBC Press, 1999.
 Warrick, Gary A. "A Population History of the Huron-Petun, A.D. 900-1650", PhD Thesis, McGill University. Montreal, PQ, 1990 (revised edition published as "A Population History of the Huron-Petun, A.D. 500-1650". New York: Cambridge University Press, 2008).

External links 
 The Huron-Wendat Museum, Wendake, Quebec
 Huron-Wendat Nation, Wendake, Quebec.

Whitchurch-Stouffville
Archaeological sites in Ontario
Iroquois populated places
First Nations history in Ontario
Wyandot
16th century in Ontario
Woodland period sites in Canada